This is the list of fictional witches.

Comics
A
 Adrazelle (Mélusine)
 Alwina (Good witch in the Suske en Wiske story "Het Spaanse Spook")
 Alwina (Evil witch in the Suske en Wiske story "De Schat van Beersel")
 Antanneke (Witch in the Suske en Wiske story "De Zeven Snaren")
 Arba (Groo the Wanderer)

B
 Queen Beryl (Sailor Moon)
 Broom-Hilda (Broom-Hilda)

C
 Queen Candy (Sugar Sugar Rune)
 Circe (DC Comics)
 Cassandra (Sabrina's Secret Life)
D
 Dakarba (Groo the Wanderer)
 Della (Sabrina the Teenage Witch)
 Magica DeSpell (various Donald Duck comics)
 Minima DeSpell (various Donald Duck comics)
 Draculaura (Monster High, 2022 version only)

E
 Edwina (Maria the Virgin Witch)
 Enchantra (Sabrina the Teenage Witch)
Enchantress (DC Comics)
Enchantress (Marvel Comics)
 Esmeralda (Sabrina the Teenage Witch)
 Eucalypta (Paulus the woodgnome)

F
 Flodderbes (De Geuzen)
 Eruka Frog (Soul Eater)

G
 Galiena (Sabrina the Teenage Witch)
 Grandmama (The Addams Family)
Grotbags (Grotbags)
 Violet Grimm (Dogwitch)
 Arachne Gorgon (Soul Eater)
 Medusa Gorgon (Soul Eater)
 Shaula Gorgon (Soul Eater Not!)

H
 Haakneus (Jommeke, Met Langteen en Schommelbuik Voorwaarts)
 Theo Hag (Fawcett Comics)
 Agatha Harkness (Marvel Comics)
 Hela de Heks (The Adventures of Nero)
 Helen (Kiff)

K
 Jennifer Kale (Marvel Comics)
 Karnilla (Marvel Comics)
 Kinetix (DC Comics)
 Kovertol (Evil witch in the Suske en Wiske story De Tuf-Tuf-Club)

L
 Angela Leon (Soul Eater)
 Laverna (Barbie: Fairytopia trilogy)
 Lydia (Barbie and the Diamond Castle)

M
 Mabaa (Soul Eater)
 Mad Hettie (The Sandman)
 The Mad Mod Witch (The Unexpected)
 Amy Madison (Buffy the Vampire Slayer)
 Maghella (Maghella)
 Magik (Marvel Comics)
 Malicella (Mélusine)
 Maria (Maria the Virgin Witch)
 Tara MacLay (Buffy the Vampire Slayer)
 Miki Makimura (Devilman Grimoire)
 Madam Mim (Disney Comics)
 Chocolat Meilleure (Sugar Sugar Rune)
 Cinnamon Meilleure (Sugar Sugar Rune)
 Mélusine (Mélusine)
 Vanilla Mieux (Sugar Sugar Rune)
 Nico Minoru (Runaways)
 The Mizune Sisters (Soul Eater)
 Morgaine le Fey (DC Comics)
 Morgan le Fey (Marvel Comics)
 Ms. Mystic (Pacific Comics)

N

 Lucinda Nightbane (Princess Lucinda)
 Millicent Nightbane (Princess Lucinda)
 Nyx (Image Comics)

O
 Old Witch (One of the mascots of EC Comics' The Haunt of Fear series)

P
 Pierehaar (Jommeke, Met Langteen en Schommelbuik Voorwaarts)

Q
 Queen of Fables (DC Comics)

R
 Roberta (Topolino, an Italian Disney comic series)
 Romilda (Yra)
 Rosalind (Sabrina the Teenage Witch)
 Willow Rosenberg (Buffy the Vampire Slayer)

S
 Salem's Seven (Marvel Comics)
 Satana (Marvel Comics)
 The Scarlet Witch (Marvel Comics)
 Schierke (Berserk)
 Sea Hag (Popeye)
 Amanda Sefton (Marvel Comics)
 Queen Seles (Sabrina the Teenage Witch)
 LLandra da Silva (Sabrina the Teenage Witch)
 Sindella (DC Comics)
 Hilda Spellman (Sabrina the Teenage Witch)
 Sabrina Spellman (Sabrina the Teenage Witch)
 Zelda Spellman (Sabrina the Teenage Witch)
 Steketand (Jommeke, Met Langteen en Schommelbuik Voorwaarts)
 Strega (DC Comics)
 Margali Szardos (Marvel Comics)

T
 Tarot (Tarot: Witch of the Black Rose)
 Thessaly (The Sandman)
 The Three (The Witching Hour, The Sandman)
 Traci Thirteen (DC Comics)
 Topaz (Marvel Comics)
 Frau Totenkinder (Fables)

V
 Viv (Maria the Virgin Witch)

W
 Waffle (Sugar Sugar Rune)
Wendy the Good Little Witch (Harvey Comics)
White Witch (DC Comics)
 Winnie the Witch (Winnie the Witch)
Witchfire (DC Comics)
Witchfire (Marvel Comics)
Wizadora 
 Wredulia (Douwe Dabbert)

X
Madame Xanadu (DC Comics)

Z
 Zatanna Zatara (DC Comics)
 De Zwarte Madam (Suske en Wiske)

Literary

A
Hannah Abbott (Harry Potter)
Sarah "Granny" Aching (Discworld)
Tiffany Aching (Discworld)
Thais Allard (Balefire)
Wisteria Allgood (Witch and Wizard series)
Jaenelle Angelline (Black Jewels Trilogy)
Anguanes (Monster Allergy)
Deborah Armstrong (The Secret Circle)
Nick Armstrong (The Secret Circle)
Agnes Nutter (Good Omens)

B

Miss Davina Bat (The Worst Witch)
Bathilda Bagshot (Harry Potter)
Jean-Baptiste Mésomier (Witches of East End/Summer on East End Series)
Anne Barklay (Witches of East End Series)
Camryn Alicia Barnes (Twitches)
Arthur Beauchamp (Witches of East End/Wolf Pact/Blue Bloods Series)
Freya Beauchamp (Witches of East End/Summer on East End Series)
Ingrid Beauchamp (Witches of East End/Summer on East End Series)
Gammer Beavis (Discworld)
Joanna Beauchamp (Witches of East End)
Katie Bell (Harry Potter)
Diana Bishop (A Discovery of Witches)
Walburga Black (Harry Potter)
Gwinifer Blackcap (Discworld)
Griselda Blackwood (The Worst Witch)
Cal Blaire (Sweep)
Cassie Blake (The Secret Circle)
Amelia Bones (Harry Potter)
Susan Bones (Harry Potter)
The Broom Witch (Ophelia Learns to Swim)
 The Beldam/The Other Mother (Coraline)
Mr. Brooks (Discworld)
Lavender Brown (Harry Potter)
Stacey Brown (Blue Is for Nightmares)
Millicent Bulstrode (Harry Potter)
Charity Burbage (Harry Potter)

C
Agatha Cackle (The Worst Witch)
Miss Amelia Cackle (The Worst Witch)
Miss Cambric (Discworld)
Mrs. Cantrip (Carbonel)
Mary Cattermole (Harry Potter)
Alecto Carrow (Harry Potter)
Minnie Castavet (Rosemary's Baby)
Faye Chamberlain (The Secret Circle)
Cho Chang (Harry Potter)
Adriane Charday (Avalon: Web of Magic)
Letitia de Chumsfanleigh (Discworld)
Circe (Homer's Odyssey)
Clarissa (Goosebumps)
Penelope Clearwater (Harry Potter)
Adam Conant (The Secret Circle)
Willie Connolly (Daughter of Darkness)
Vey Coruscant (Doctrine of Labyrinths)
Annie Crandall (Circle of Three)
Cutty-sark (Robert Burns, Tam o' Shanter)

D
Vanessa Dahl (Engelsfors)
Aunt Dahlia (Goosebumps)
Dark Sorceress (Avalon:Web of Magic) 
Kara Davies (Avalon: Web of Magic)
Alice Deane (The Spook's Apprentice)
Fleur Delacour (Harry Potter)
Gabrielle Delacour (Harry Potter)
Patricia Delfine (All the Birds in the Sky) 
Delphini (Harry Potter and the Cursed Child)
"Black" Aliss Demurrage (Discworld)
Kim Diehl (Soul Eater)
Beryl "Old Mother" Dismass (Discworld)
Dorrie the Little Witch (Dorrie the Little Witch Series)
Gemma Doyle (The Gemma Doyle Trilogy)
Ileana DuBauer (Twitches)
Miranda Martine-DuBauer (Twitches)
Lena Duchannes (Caster Chronicles series)
Ridley Duchannes (Caster Chronicles series)
Sarafine Duchannes (Caster Chronicles series)
Ariana Dumbledore (Harry Potter)
Gillian Duncan (Salem Falls)
The Dust Witch (Something Wicked This Way Comes)
Mirri Maz Duur (A Song of Ice and Fire)

E
Mrs Letice Earwig (Discworld)
Marietta Edgecombe (Harry Potter)
Elphaba (Wicked: The Life and Times of the Wicked Witch of the West)
Empusa (Stardust)
Erichtho (Lucan's Pharsalia)
Tabitha Evans (Shadow Falls)

F
Mrs Fairfax (Howl's Moving Castle)
Minoo Falk Karimi (Engelsfors)
Angelica Pierce Fear (Fear Street)
Fenella Feverfew (The Worst Witch)
Alexandra Nicole Fielding (Twitches)
Emily Fletcher (Avalon: Web of Magic)
Mrs. Flowers (The Vampire Diaries)
Kimberly Ford (The Fionavar Tapestry)

G
Magrat Garlick (Discworld)
Gayelette (The Wonderful Wizard of Oz)
The Bene Gesserit (Dune)
Glinda, the Good Witch of the South (The Wonderful Wizard of Oz)
Melissa Glaser (The Secret Circle)
Hilta Goatfounder (Discworld)
Erzulie Gogol (Discworld)
Good Witch of the North (The Wonderful Wizard of Oz)
Dame Gothel (Rapunzel)
The Grand High Witch (The Witches)
Hermione Granger (Harry Potter)
Polly Green (Jingle Belle)
Astoria Greengrass (Harry Potter)
Petulia Gristle (Discworld)
Tanya Grotter (Tanya Grotter)
Wilhelima Grubbly-Plank (Harry Potter)

H
Ethel Hallow (The Worst Witch)
Mona Hallow (The Worst Witch)
Sybil Hallow (The Worst Witch)
Ammeline Hamstring (Discworld)
Mrs. Happenstance (Discworld)
Miss Constance Hardbroom (The Worst Witch)
Sophie Hatter (Howl's Moving Castle)
Annagramma Hawkin (Discworld)
Ida Holmström (Engelsfors)
Desiderata Hollow (Discworld)
Rolanda Hooch (Harry Potter)
Mafalda Hopkirk (Harry Potter)
Henrieta "Hettie" Hubble (The Worst Witch)
Mildred "Millie" Hubble (The Worst Witch)
Dimmity Hubbub (Discworld)
Helga Hufflepuff (Harry Potter)

I
Yûko Ichihara (xxxHolic)
Ilse Witch (Ilse Witch)
Immacolata (character) (Weaveworld)
Tilly Ipswitch (Tilly Witch)
Iris (Goosebumps Series 2000)
Ischade (Thieves' World)
Ivalaine (The Last Rune)

J
Jadis of Charn, the White Witch (Narnia)
Jaelle (The Fionavar Tapestry)
Angelina Johnson (Harry Potter)
Hestia Jones (Harry Potter)
Bertha Jorkins (Harry Potter)
Juniper (Juniper, Wise Child and Colman by Monica Furlong)

K
Miranda Kane (Shadow Falls)
Kyrene (The Last Rune)

L

Lamia (Stardust)
Briony Larkin (Chime)
Lilli (Lilli the Witch)
Lady of the Green Kirtle (Narnia)
Leanne (Harry Potter)
Bellatrix Lestrange (Harry Potter)
Miss Level (Discworld)
Alice Longbottom (Harry Potter)
Augusta Longbottom (Harry Potter)
Luna Lovegood (Harry Potter)
Brenda Loveknot (Discworld)
Lythande (Thieves' World, Lythande)

M
Aunt Mab (Graveyard School)
Ciaran MacEwan (Sweep)
Maghatch (Thunder Oak)
Maharet and Mekare (The Vampire Chronicles)
Makenna (The Goblin Wood)
Maleen, Goth and The Leewit (The Witches of Karres) by James H Schmitz
Narcissa Malfoy (Harry Potter)
Mallenroh (The Elfstones of Shannara)
Madam Malkin (Harry Potter)
Mother Malkin (The Spook's Apprentice, The Wardstone Chronicles)
Griselda Marchbanks (Harry Potter)
Margarita (The Master and Margarita)
Clio Martin (Balefire)
Petra Martin (Balefire)
Keziah Mason (The Dreams in the Witch-House)
Nurse Matilda (Nurse Matilda)
Olympe Maxime (Harry Potter)
The Mayfair Witches (The Witching Hour, Lasher, and Taltos)
Bonnie McCullough (The Vampire Diaries)
Diana Meade (The Secret Circle)
Meg (Meg and Mog)
Melisandre, The Red Woman (A Song of Ice and Fire)
Melissa (Matter of France)
Triss Merigold (The Witcher)
Minerva McGonagall (Harry Potter)
Mimi the Witch (Ninja High School)
Miranda (Shadow Falls)
Mombi, (The Marvelous Land of Oz, The Lost King of Oz, Lucky Bucky in Oz)
Maud Moonshine (The Worst Witch)
Rebecka Mohlin (Engelsfors)
Morag (The Elfstones of Shannara)
Kate Morgan (Circle of Three)
Rachel Morgan (Hollows (series))
Morgan La Fey ("Excalibur")
Mormo (Stardust)
Madame Morrible (Wicked: The Life and Times of the Wicked Witch of the West)
Morwen (Enchanted Forest Chronicles)
Moss (Tehanu)

N
Natasha (The Master and Margarita)
Nessarose, the Wicked Witch of the East (Wicked: The Life and Times of the Wicked Witch of the West)
Nettle (Discworld)
Anna-Karin Nieminen (Engelsfors)
Enid Nightshade (The Worst Witch)
Agnes Nitt (Discworld)
Strega Nona (Strega Nona)
Agnes Nutter (Good Omens)

O
Gytha "Nanny" Ogg (Discworld)
Tiola Oldstagh (the Sea Witch series) by Helen Hollick
Madame Olympia (Which Witch?)
Mardi Overbrook (Summer on East End Series)
Molly Overbrook (Summer on East End Series)
Troy Overbrook (Summer on East End Series)
Orddu (The Black Cauldron)
Orgoch (The Black Cauldron)
Orwen (The Black Cauldron)
The Other Mother (Coraline)

P
Mistress Letty Parkin (Discworld)
Pansy Parkinson (Harry Potter)
Padma Patil (Harry Potter)
Parvati Patil (Harry Potter)
Pekka (Darkness)
Serafina Pekkala (His Dark Materials)
Persephone (The Raven Cycle)
Amber Petty (Discworld)
Irma Pince (Harry Potter)
Polgara the Sorceress (Belgariad and Mallorean)
Poppy Pomfrey (Harry Potter)
Lily Potter (Harry Potter)
Lily Luna Potter (Harry Potter)
Mrs. Proust (Discworld)

Q
Queen (Snow White)
Laurel Quincey (The Secret Circle)

R
Helena Ravenclaw (Harry Potter)
Rowena Ravenclaw (Harry Potter)
Emma Fier Reade (Fear Street)
Rhea of the Coos (The Dark Tower series)
Mother Rigby (Feathertop, short story by Nathaniel Hawthorne)
Cooper Rivers (Circle of Three)
Demelza Robins (Harry Potter)
Madam Rosmerta (Harry Potter)
Sukie Rougemont (The Witches of Eastwick) by John Updike
Morgan Rowlands (Sweep) by Cate Tiernan
Roxane (Thieves' World)

S
Sarabeth (Goosebumps)
Sea Witch (The Little Mermaid)
Madame Semele (Stardust)
Shiara (Enchanted Forest Chronicles)
Mistress Shimmy (Discworld)
Singra (The Wicked Witch of Oz)
Aurora Sinistra (Harry Potter)
Ruta Skadi (His Dark Materials)
Rita Skeeter (Harry Potter)
Jane Smart (The Witches of Eastwick) by John Updike
Hepzibah Smith (Harry Potter)
Caryn Smoke (Shattered Mirror)
Snow Queen (The Snow Queen)
Snow Witch (Fighting Fantasy)
Alisa Soto (Sweep)
Spider Witch (Avalon: Web of Magic)
Alicia Spinnet (Harry Potter)
Alexandra Spofford (The Witches of Eastwick) by John Updike
Pomona Sprout (Harry Potter)
Susan Sto Helit (Discworld)
Geoffrey Swivel (Discworld)
Deirdre Swoop (The Worst Witch)
Sycorax (The Tempest)
Sally Rumeno (‘’Sally the Witch’’)

T
The T*Witches: Camryn Barnes and Alexandra Fielding
Tarot (Tarot, Witch of the Black Rose)
Miss Tick (Discworld)
Diamanda Tockley (Discworld)
Rose Threep (Whispering to Witches)
The Three Witches (Macbeth)
Ruby Tōjō (Rosario + Vampire)
Andromeda Tonks (Harry Potter)
Nymphadora Tonks (Harry Potter)
Eumendines Treason (Discworld)
Sybill Trelawney (Harry Potter)

U
Dolores Umbridge (Harry Potter)

V
Emmeline Vance (Harry Potter)
Romilda Vane (Harry Potter)
Vanessa (Goosebumps)
Septima Vector (Harry Potter)
Sarah Tigress Vida (Shattered Mirror)
Dominique Vida (Shattered Mirror)
Adrianna Vida (Shattered Mirror)

W
Linnéa Wallin (Engelsfors)
Lucy Warbeck (Discworld)
Myrtle Warren (Harry Potter)
Ginevra Weasley (Harry Potter)
Molly Weasley (Harry Potter)
Rose Granger-Weasley (Harry Potter)
Victoire Weasley (Harry Potter)
Alison "Nana" Weatherwax (Discworld)
Esmeralda "Granny" Weatherwax (Discworld)
Lily Weatherwax (Discworld)
Kara Westfall (The Thickety)
Wicked Witch of the East (The Wonderful Wizard of Oz)
Wicked Witch of the West (The Wonderful Wizard of Oz)
Winnie (Winnie the Witch)
Paige Winterbourne (Dime Store Magic)
The Witch (never named) in Simon and the Witch
Lolly Willowes, title character of book by Sylvia Townsend Warner
Winsome Witch (Secret Squirrel)
Witch of the Waste (Howl's Moving Castle)
Goodie Whemper (Discworld)
Suzan Whittier (The Secret Circle)
Mabel Wrack (Which Witch?)

X
Xayide (Neverending Story)

Y
Yukari Sendo (Rosario + Vampire)
Ysanne (The Fionavar Tapestry)
Yennefer of Vengerberg(The Witcher)

Z
Florence Zimmerman (The House with a Clock in Its Walls)
Queen Zixi of Ix (Queen Zixi of Ix)

Film and television
A
Hannah Abbott (Harry Potter)
Agnes (The Vampire Diaries and The Originals)
Aja (The Vampire Diaries)
Homura Akemi/Homulilly (Puella Magi Madoka Magica)
Alexis (The Vampire Diaries)
Alice (Merlin)
Emma Alonso (Every Witch Way)
Amara (Once Upon a Time in Wonderland)
Angelique (Dark Shadows)
Anastasia (Once Upon a Time)
Anastasia (Once Upon a Time in Wonderland)
Marina Andrieski (The Magicians)
Ange-Beatrice (Umineko no Naku Koro ni)
Anguanes (Monster Allergy)
Jasminka Antonenko (Little Witch Academia)
Lily Archer (Every Witch Way)
Ariel (Fantasy Island)
Jake Armstrong (The Secret Circle)
Nick Armstrong (The Secret Circle)
Richard Armstrong (The Secret Circle)
Royce Armstrong (The Secret Circle)
Sara Armstrong (The Secret Circle)
Arusu (Tweeny Witches)
Mirai Asahina (Maho Girls PreCure!)
Atelia (Tweeny Witches)
Featherine Augustus Aurora (Umineko no Naku Koro ni Chiru)
Azkadellia (Tin Man)
Ayana (The Vampire Diaries)
Agatha (Chilling Adventures of Sabrina)

B
Sarah Baily (The Craft)
Lady Bane (Disney's Adventures of the Gummi Bears)
Camryn Elizabeth Barnes (Twitches)
Bathsheba (The Conjuring)
Bathilda Bagshot (Harry Potter)
Barunn (Tweeny Witches)
Battler (Umineko no Naku Koro ni Chiru)
Queen Bavmorda (Willow)
Beatrice (Umineko no Naku Koro ni)
Freya Beauchamp (Witches of East End)
Ingrid Beauchamp (Witches of East End)
Joanna Beauchamp (Witches of East End)
Wendy Beauchamp (Witches of East End)
Katie Bell (Harry Potter)
Belor (Into the Labyrinth)
Bonnie Bennett (The Vampire Diaries)
Emily Bennett (The Vampire Diaries)
Grace Bennett (Passions)
Kay Bennett (Passions)
Lucy Bennett (The Vampire Diaries)
Sheila Bennett (The Vampire Diaries)
Zoe Benson (American Horror Story: Coven)
Bernkastel (Umineko no Naku Koro ni)
Queen Beryl (Sailor Moon)
Great Aunt Beulah (Sabrina, the Teenage Witch)
Belladonna Bindweed (The New Worst Witch)
Big Witch (The Nightmare Before Christmas)
Isabel Bigelow (Bewitched (film))
Biris (Tweeny Witches)
Black Witch/Black Queen (Fantaghirò)
John Blackwell (The Secret Circle)
Griselda Blackwood (The Worst Witch)
Amelia Blake (The Secret Circle)
Cassie Blake (The Secret Circle)
Jane Blake (The Secret Circle)
Madame Blanc (Suspiria)
Blind Witch (Once Upon a Time)
Mother Bloodtide (Doctor Who: The Shakespeare Code)
Amelia Bones (Harry Potter)
Susan Bones (Harry Potter)
Constanze Amalie von Braunschbank Albrechtsberger (Little Witch Academia)
Hannah Bright (Switch)
Mistress Hecate Broomhead (The Worst Witch)
Lavender Brown (Harry Potter)
Millicent Bulstrode (Harry Potter)
The Beldam/The Other Mother (Coraline)
Charity Burbage (Harry Potter)

C
Agatha Cackle (The Worst Witch)
Miss Amelia Cackle (The Worst Witch)
Queen Candy (Sugar Sugar Rune)
Alecto Carrow (Harry Potter)
Flora Carrow (Harry Potter)
Hestia Carrow (Harry Potter)
Castaspella (She-Ra: Princess of Power)
Minnie Castavet (Rosemary's Baby)
Mary Cattermole (Harry Potter)
Diana Cavendish (Little Witch Academia)
C.C. (Code Geass)
Dawn Chamberlain (The Secret Circle)
Faye Chamberlain (The Secret Circle)
Chappy (Mahōtsukai Chappy)
Charal (Ewoks: The Battle for Endor)
Shiny Chariot (Little Witch Academia)
Charlotte (Puella Magi Madoka Magica)
Ruby Cherrytree (The Worst Witch)
Cho Chang (Harry Potter)
Circe (Hercules)
Davina Claire (The Originals)
Mary-Alice Claire (The Originals)
Aunt Clara (Bewitched)
Helen Clarke (Wizards vs Aliens)
Claudia (A Simple Wish)
Eda Clawthorne (The Owl House)
Joan Clayton (Penny Dreadful)
Penelope Clearwater (Harry Potter)
Holly Cleary (True Blood)
Queen Clementianna (Mirror Mirror)
Mary Collins (Merlin)
Adam Conant (The Secret Circle)
Ethan Conant (The Secret Circle)
Cora (Once Upon a Time)
Katrina Crane (Sleepy Hollow)
The Cromwell Witches (Halloweentown)
Splendora Agatha Cromwell (Halloweentown Series)
Miss Lavinia Crotchet (The Worst Witch)
Clarice Crow (The Worst Witch)
Ursula Crowe (Wizards vs Aliens)
Cas Crowfeather (Weirdsister College)

D
Dahlia (The Originals)
Tia Dalma (Pirates of the Caribbean (film series))
Darcy (Winx Club)
Dark Witch (Fantaghirò series)
Misty Day (American Horror Story: Coven)
Bianca de Passe (Bell, Book and Candle)
Magica De Spell (DuckTales)
Ella Dee (Hex)
Fleur Delacour (Harry Potter)
Gabrielle Delacour (Harry Potter)
Desdemona (Every Witch Way)
Monique Deveraux (The Originals)
Sophie Deveraux (The Vampire Diaries and The Originals)
Cruella Deville (Once Upon a Time)
Lady Diabolyn (Wildfire)
Dictchwater Sal (Stardust)
Mother Doomfinger (Doctor Who: The Shakespeare Code)
Great Aunt Dorma (Sabrina, the Teenage Witch)
Nancy Downs (The Craft)
Penny Dreadful XIII (Penny Dreadful's Shilling Shockers)
Dreama (Sabrina the Teenage Witch)
Drizella (Once Upon a Time)
Miranda DuBauer (Twitches)
Celeste Dubois (The Vampire Diaries)
Lena Duchannes (Beautiful Creatures)
Ridley Duchannes (Beautiful Creatures)
Sarafine Duchannes (Beautiful Creatures)
Dust Witch (Something Wicked This Way Comes)
Mirri Maz Duur (Game of Thrones)
Dorcas Chilling Adventures of Sabrina (TV series)

E
Aunt Enchantra (Bewitched)
The Enchantress (Beauty and the Beast)
Endora (Bewitched)
Elaine (The Love Witch)
Queen Elspeth (Snow White: The Fairest of Them All)
Elvira (Elvira, Mistress of the Dark)
Eris (Slayers)
Evanora (Oz the Great and Powerful)
Evil Edna (Willo the Wisp)
Evil-Lyn (Masters of the Universe)
Evilene (The Wiz)
Emily Bennett (The Vampire Diaries)
Eva (Tweeny Witches)
Evie (Descendants)
Elspeth ( Chilling Adventures of Sabrina)

F
Fenella Ferfew (The Worst Witch)
Alexandra Nicole Fielding (Twitches)
Cordelia Foxx (American Horror Story: Coven)
Joanna Frankel (Eastwick)
Freya, the Ice Queen (The Huntsman: Winter's War)
Hazuki Fujiwara (Ojamajo Doremi)
Erika Furudo (Umineko no Naku Koro ni Chiru)

G
Gaana the Grand Master of Witches (Tweeny Witches)
Sylvia Ganush (Drag Me to Hell)
Katherine Gardener (Eastwick)
Antonia Gavilán de Logroño (True Blood)
Genevieve (The Originals)
Grand High Witch (The Witches, 1990 & 2020 film)
Gertrud (Puella Magi Madoka Magica))
Glacia the Ice Witch (Sofia the First in the episode "Winter's Gift")
Melissa Glaser (The Secret Circle)
Glinda (The Wizard of Oz)
Hildy Gloom (The 7D)
Gloria (The Vampire Diaries)
Porpentina Goldstein (Fantastic Beasts and Where to Find Them)
Queenie Goldstein (Fantastic Beasts and Where to Find Them)
Arachne Gorgon (Soul Eater)
Medusa Gorgon (Soul Eater)
Veronica Gorloisen (The Sorcerer's Apprentice)
Harriet Goodcharm (The Worst Witch)
Fiona Goode (American Horror Story: Coven)
Chancellor Goodwin (Return to Halloweentown)
Sarah Goodwin (The Initiation of Sarah)
Winnie Goodwin (Free Spirit)
Gothel (Once Upon a Time)
Cousin Zsa Zsa Goowhiggie (Sabrina the Teenage Witch)
The Grand Witch (Scooby-Doo! and the Goblin King)
Grandmama (The Addams Family)
Great Granny (Sabrina, the Teenage Witch)
Hermione Granger (Harry Potter)
Astoria Greengrass (Harry Potter)
Queen Grimhilde (Snow White and the Seven Dwarfs)
Grotbags (Emu's World)
Wilhelmina Grubbly-Plank (Harry Potter)
Gwen (Sabrina Goes to Rome and Sabrina, Down Under)

H
Aunt Hagatha (Bewitched)
Haggar (Voltron: Defender of the Universe, Voltron: The Third Dimension, Voltron: Legendary Defender)
Haggis (Pumpkinhead)
Anne Hale (Salem)
Chris Halliwell (Charmed)
Melinda Halliwell (Charmed)
Patricia Halliwell (Charmed)
Penny Halliwell (Charmed)
Phoebe Halliwell (Charmed)
Piper Halliwell (Charmed)
Prue Halliwell (Charmed)
Wyatt Matthew Halliwell (Charmed)
Ethel Hallow (The Worst Witch))
Mona Hallow (The New Worst Witch)
Sybil Hallow (The Worst Witch)
Margo Hanson (The Magicians)
Miss Constance Hardbroom (The Worst Witch)
Agatha Harkness (WandaVision)
Pamela Harman (Paradise Falls)
Doremi Harukaze (Ojamajo Doremi)
Hazel the McWitch (Rentaghost)
Witch Hazel (Disney)
Witch Hazel (Looney Tunes)
Hecuba (Passions)
Hexuba (Power Rangers: Lost Galaxy)
Hillary Hexton (Sabrina, Down Under)
Madelyne Hibbins (Smallville)
Touko Hio (Witchcraft Works)
Claudia Hoffman (Snow White: A Tale of Terror)
Gillian Holroyd (Bell, Book and Candle)
Queenie Holroyd (Bell, Book and Candle)
Rolanda Hooch (Harry Potter)
Mafalda Hopkirk (Harry Potter)
Cynthia Horrocks (The New Worst Witch)
Henrietta "Hettie" Hubble (The New Worst Witch)
Mildred Hubble (The Worst Witch)
Cassie Hughes (Hex)
Bonnie Hyper (The Craft)

I
Icy (Winx Club)
Indigo (Sofia the First)
Ingrid (Once Upon a Time)
Inukai (Flying Witch)
Lina Inverse (Slayers)
Great Aunt Irma (Sabrina, the Teenage Witch)
Miss Susan Irvine (The Witches)
Vanessa Ives (Penny Dreadful)
Riko Izayoi (Maho Girls PreCure!)
Izetta (Izetta: The Last Witch)

J
Jadis, the White Witch (The Chronicles of Narnia: The Lion, the Witch and the Wardrobe)
Lotte Jansson (Little Witch Academia)
Billie Jenkins (Charmed)
Christy Jenkins (Charmed)
Jennifer (I Married a Witch)
Jezebelda (Sabrina, the Teenage Witch)
Joan (Hereditary)
Angelina Johnson (Harry Potter)

K
Atsuko "Akko" Kagari (Little Witch Academia)
Ayaka Kagari (Witchcraft Works)
Kazane Kagari (Witchcraft Works)
Lady Kale (Princess Gwenevere and the Jewel Riders)
Madoka Kaname/Kriemhild Gretchen (Puella Magi Madoka Magica)
Megu Kanzaki (Majokko Megu-chan)
Katrina (Sabrina, the Teenage Witch)
Kotetsu Katsura (Witchcraft Works)
Kaylee (American Horror Story: Coven)
Rin Kazari (Witchcraft Works)
Elly Kedward (The Blair Witch Project)
Kiki (Kiki's Delivery Service)
Kinvara (Game of Thrones)
Gail Kipling (Sabrina, the Teenage Witch)
Akane Kowata (Flying Witch)
Makoto Kowata (Flying Witch)
Atori Kuramine (Witchcraft Works)

L
Mater Lachrymarum (Mother of Tears)
Lady of the Green Kirtle (The Chronicles of Narnia)
Lambdadelta (Umineko no Naku Koro ni)
Lamia and her sisters Empusa and Mormo (Stardust)
Josephine LaRue (The Originals)
Josette Laughlin (The Vampire Diaries)
Sabine Laurent (The Originals)
Marie Laveau (American Horror Story: Coven)
Leanne (Harry Potter)
Juniper Lee (The Life and Times of Juniper Lee)
Marie LeFleur (Chilling Adventures of Sabrina)
Anna Leigh Leighton (American Horror Story: Coven)
Leith/Sylvie (Emerald City)
Endora Lenox (Passions)
Leta Lestrange (Fantastic Beasts and Where to Find Them)
Bellatrix Lestrange (Harry Potter)
Mercy Lewis (Salem)
Tabitha Lenox (Passions)
Lilith (Doctor Who: The Shakespeare Code)
Lily (Every Witch Way)
Lily (Sofia the First)
Lirio (The Craft)
Little Witch (The Nightmare Before Christmas)
Lucinda (Sofia the First)
Alice Longbottom (Harry Potter)
Luna Lovegood (Harry Potter)
Lilith (Chilling Adventures of Sabrina)

M
Queen Mab (Merlin)
Tara Maclay (Buffy the Vampire Slayer)
Amy Madison (Buffy the Vampire Slayer)
Catherine Madison (Buffy the Vampire Slayer)
Maggy the Frog (Game of Thrones)
Astrid Malchance (The Originals)
Narcissa Malfoy (Harry Potter)
Mother Malkin (Seventh Son)
Mallory (American Horror Story: Apocalypse)
Mamanu (Sofia the First)
Sucy Manbavaran (Little Witch Academia)
Countess Palatine Ingrid Von Marburg (Salem)
Maria (Umineko no Naku Koro ni)
Helena Markos (Suspiria)
Marla (Sofia the First)
Greta Martins (The Vampire Diaries)
Paige Matthews (Charmed)
Olympe Maxime (Harry Potter)
Wanda Maximoff/ Scarlet Witch (Marvel Cinematic Universe)
Rachel McBain ((Hex))
Minerva McGonagall (Harry Potter)
Sally "Thorn" McKnight (Scooby-Doo! and the Witch's Ghost)
Nanny McPhee (Nanny McPhee)
Elizabeth Meade (The Secret Circle)
Diana Meade (The Secret Circle)
Kate Meade (The Secret Circle)
Alexandra Medford (The Witches of Eastwick)
Medusa (Witchcraft Works)
Cinnamon Meilleure (Sugar Sugar Rune)
Chocolat Meilleure (Sugar Sugar Rune)
Melisandre, The Red Priestess (Game of Thrones)
Mei Menowa (Witchcraft Works)
Mesmira (Conan the Adventurer)
Kyōichirō Mikage (Witchcraft Works)
Mina (Hansel and Gretel: Witch Hunters)
Esther Mikaelson (The Vampire Diaries) and (The Originals)
Freya Mikaelson (The Originals (TV series))
Hope Andrea Mikaelson (The Originals) and (Legacies)
Louise Miller (Teen Witch)
Regina Mills (Once Upon A Time)
Sayaka Miki/Oktavia von Seckendorff (Puella Magi Madoka Magica)
Madam Mim (The Sword in the Stone)
Misty the Wonderful Witch (Jake and the Never Land Pirates)
Mirror Queen (The Brother's Grimm)
Mombi (The Wonderful Land of Oz) and (Return to Oz)
Nagisa Momoe/Charlotte/Bebe (Puella Magi Madoka Magica)
Madison Montgomery (American Horror Story: Coven)
June Moone/ Enchantress (Suicide Squad)
Morag the Tulgah Witch (Ewoks)
Morgana Macawber (Darkwing Duck)
Morgana (The Little Mermaid II: Return to the Sea)
Morgana (Princess Gwenevere and the Jewel Riders)
Morgana (Sofia the First in the episode "Gone with the Wand")
Queen Morgana (King Arthur and the Knights of Justice)
Morgause (Merlin)
Mortianna (Robin Hood: Prince of Thieves)
Stella Munroe (Switch)
Muriel (Hansel & Gretel: Witch Hunters)
Dyllis Mustardseed (The New Worst Witch)

N
Naga the Serpent (Slayers)
Nan (American Horror Story: Coven)
Queen Narissa (Enchanted)
Bastianna Natale (The Originals)
Nerabu (Tweeny Witches)
Stevie Nicks (American Horror Story: Coven)
Cassie Nightingale (The Good Witch)
Miss Nightingale (The New Worst Witch)
Enid Nightshade (The Worst Witch)
Nimue (Once Upon a Time)
Nimueh (Merlin)
Prudence Night Chilling Adventures of Sabrina (TV series)

O
Obaba (Mahōtsukai Chappy)
Mama Odie (The Princess and the Frog)
Amanda O'Neill (Little Witch Academia)
Orddu (The Black Cauldron)
Orgoch (The Black Cauldron)
Kady Orloff-Diaz (The Magicians)
Orwen (The Black Cauldron)
The Other Mother or the beldam (Coraline)
Rinon Otometachibana (Witchcraft Works)
Gillian Owens (Practical Magic)
Sally Owens (Practical Magic)
Bridget "Jet" Owens (Practical Magic)
Maria Owens (Practical Magic)
Frances Owens (Practical Magic)
Antonia Owens (Practical Magic)
Kylie Owens (Practical Magic)

P
Drusilla Paddock (The Worst Witch)
Penelope Park (Legacies)
Lucas Parker (The Vampire Diaries)
Malachai Parker (The Vampire Diaries)
Olivia Parker (The Vampire Diaries)
Pansy Parkinson (Harry Potter)
Padma Patil (Harry Potter)
Parvati Patil (Harry Potter)
Frau Pech (Grimm)
Pei-Pei (Freaky Friday (2003 film))
Mrs Pentstemmon (Howl's Moving Castle)
Serafina Pekkala (The Golden Compass)
Cecily Pembroke (American Horror Story: Coven)
Lady Morgana Pendragon (Merlin)
Seraphina Picquery (Fantastic Beasts and Where to Find Them)
Irma Pince (Harry Potter)
Gwen Piper (Halloweentown Series)
Marnie Piper (Halloweentown Series)
Sophie Piper (Halloweentown Series)
Poppy Pomfrey (Harry Potter)
Evelyn Poole (Penny Dreadful)
Hecate Poole (Penny Dreadful)
Lily Potter (Harry Potter)
Lily Luna Potter (Harry Potter)
Eglantine Price (Bedknobs and Broomsticks)

Q
Qetsiyah (The Vampire Diaries)
Qoo (Tweeny Witches)
Queen of the Crown (The Adventures of the Galaxy Rangers)
Queenie (American Horror Story: Coven)
Alice Quinn (The Magicians)
Ivory Quintet (Witchcraft Works)

R
Ramona (Every Witch Way)
Rarity the Unicorn (My Little Pony: The Runaway Rainbow)
Raven Roth (Teen Titans)
Helena Ravenclaw (Harry Potter)
Sarah Ravencroft (Scooby-Doo! and the Witch's Ghost)
Queen Ravenna (Snow White and the Huntsman)
Fin Raziel (Willow)
Madame Razz (She-Ra: Princess of Power)
Rita Repulsa (Mighty Morphin Power Rangers)
Revolta (Scooby-Doo and the Ghoul School)
Sukie Ridgemont (The Witches of Eastwick)
Majo Rika (Ojamajo Doremi)
Demelza Robins (Harry Potter)
Willow Rosenberg (Buffy the Vampire Slayer)
Madam Rosmerta (Harry Potter)
Ruby (Supernatural)
Rowena (Supernatural)
Rumina (The Adventures of Sinbad)
Alex Russo (Wizards of Waverly Place)

S
Sadira (Aladdin)
Kyoko Sakura/Ophelia (Puella Magi Madoka Magica)
Elvira Montero Azardon de Salcedo (Ilumina)
Josie Saltzman (The Vampire Diaries) and (Legacies)
Lizzie Saltzman (The Vampire Diaries) and (Legacies)
Mary Sanderson (Hocus Pocus)
Sarah Sanderson (Hocus Pocus)
Winifred Sanderson (Hocus Pocus)
Sarah (Stranger in Our House)
Scáthach (American Horror Story: Roanoke)
Adalind Schade (Grimm)
Catherine Schade (Grimm)
Chronoire Schwarz VI (Witchcraft Works)
Scylla (Dragons II: The Metal Ages)
Sea Hag (Thimble Theatre and Popeye)
Sea Witch (Jake and the Never Land Pirates)
Elsa Sebastian (Ilumina)
Melina Montero Azardon de Sebastian (Ilumina)
Romana Sebastian (Ilumina) 
Tina Sebastian (Ilumina)
Selena (Supergirl)
Elizabeth Selwyn (The City of the Dead)
Robin Sena (Witch Hunter Robin)
Aiko Senō (Ojamajo Doremi)
Serena (Bewitched)
Madam Serena (Teen Witch)
Mary Sibley (Salem)
Eva Sinclair (The Originals)
Aurora Sinistra (Harry Potter)
Snazzy Shazam (The 7D)
Shelia (Tweeny Witches)
Anzu Shiina and her Mother (Flying Witch)
Myra Shumway (Rough Magic)
Shuriki (Elena and the Secret of Avalor)
Rita Skeeter (Harry Potter)
Christine Slevil-Lewis-White, (The 10th Kingdom)
Myrtle Snow (American Horror Story: Coven)
Sorceress of Castle Grayskull (Masters of the Universe)
Rosanne Speedwell (The New Worst Witch)
Hilda Spellman (Sabrina, the Teenage Witch)
Grandma Lydia Spellman (Sabrina, the Teenage Witch)
Sabrina Spellman (Sabrina, the Teenage Witch)
Sophia Spellman (Sabrina, the Teenage Witch)
Aunt Vesta Spellman (Sabrina, the Teenage Witch)
Zelda Spellman (Sabrina the Teenage Witch)
Alicia Spinnet (Harry Potter)
Jane Spofford (The Witches of Eastwick)
Pomona Sprout (Harry Potter)
Charity Standish (Passions)
Samantha Stephens (Bewitched)
Tabitha Stephens (Bewitched and Tabitha)
Haley Stephenson (Angel)
Dinah Stevens (American Horror Story: Apocalypse)
Mable, Margo and Mitzy Stillman (Charmed)
Marnie Stonebrook (True Blood)
Stormy (Winx Club)
Coco St. Pierre Vanderbilt (American Horror Story: Apocalypse)
Cousin Susie (Sabrina, the Teenage Witch)
Emma Swan (Once Upon a Time)
Deirdre Swoop (The New Worst Witch)

T
Kasumi Takamiya (Witchcraft Works)
Mother Talzin (Star Wars)
Miss Tanner (Suspiria)
Ellen Taper-Leigh (Hereditary)
Aldetha Teach (Blackbeard's Ghost)
Mater Tenebrarum (Inferno)
Theodora (Oz the Great and Powerful)
Jude Thomas (Switch)
Thomasin (The Witch)
Countess Isobel Marguerite Thoreau (Smallville)
Alicia Thunderblast (Weirdsister College)
Emma Tig (Legacies)
Principal Torres (Every Witch Way)
Tojola (Rough Magic)
Mami Tomoe/Candeloro (Puella Magi Madoka Magica)
Nymphadora Tonks (Harry Potter)
Tituba (Salem)
The Three Mothers (The Three Mothers trilogy)
Hyacinthe Thistlethorps (Big Wolf on Campus)
Roxanne Torcoletti (Eastwick)
Sybil Trelawney (Harry Potter)
The Tri Chi Sorority alias Christy McGraw, Jenifer Hopper and Kim Wilson (Big Wolf on Campus)

U
Dolores Umbridge (Harry Potter)
Urasue (InuYasha)
Ursula (The Little Mermaid)
Kanna Utsugi (Witchcraft Works)

V
Valeena (Super Robot Monkey Team Hyperforce Go!)
Romilda Vane (Harry Potter)
Emmeline Vance (Harry Potter)
Maddie Van Pelt (Every Witch Way)
Ursula Van Pelt (Every Witch Way)
Lady Van Tassel and her sister the Crone from (Sleepy Hollow)
Asa Vajda (Black Sunday)
Septima Vector (Harry Potter)
Asajj Ventress (Star Wars)
Violet Devereaux (The Skeleton Key)
Virgilia (Umineko no Naku Koro ni)
Liesel von Rhuman ( Death Becomes Her )

W
Waffle (Sugar Sugar Rune)
Jadu Wali (The Worst Witch)
Walpurgis Night (Puella Magi Madoka Magica)
Rosalind Walker (Chilling Adventures of Sabrina)
Ruth Walker (Chilling Adventures of Sabrina)
Ileana Warburton (Twitches)
Brianna Warren (Charmed)
Melinda Warren (Charmed)
Myrtle Warren (Harry Potter)
Prudence Warren (Charmed)
The Warren Witches (Charmed)
Grace Watkins (Switch)
Shadow Weaver (She-Ra: Princess of Power)
Ginny Weasley (Harry Potter)
Molly Weasley (Harry Potter)
Rose Granger-Weasley (Harry Potter)
Weekend (Witchcraft Works)
Jenny Wendle (Weirdsister College)
Cousin Doris West (Sabrina, the Teenage Witch)
Willow Rosenberg (Buffy the Vampire Slayer)
White Witch (Fantaghiro)
Cousin Amanda Wiccan (Sabrina the Teenage Witch)
Cousin Ally Wiccan (Sabrina the Teenage Witch)
Cousin Marigold Wiccan (Sabrina, the Teenage Witch)
Wicked (Cyberchase)
The Wicked Witch of the West (The Wizard of Oz)
Julia Wicker (The Magicians)
Miss Widget (The New Worst Witch)
Abigail Williams (The Sorcerer's Apprentice)
Winifred (a.k.a. Freddie) (Chip 'n Dale Rescue Rangers in the episode "Good Times, Bat Times")
Winsome Witch (Secret Squirrel)
Crescentmoon "Cressie" Winterchild (The New Worst Witch)
Witch of the Waste (Howl's Moving Castle) 
The Witch (Monty Python and the Holy Grail)
The Witch (Scooby-Doo, in the episode "Which Witch is Which")
The Witch (Big Fish)
The Witch (Brave)
The Witch (Into the Woods)
Witchiepoo (H.R. Pufnstuf)
Witchmon (Digimon)
Brianna Withridge (Smallville)
Wizadora (Wizardora)
The Witches of Woodstock (American Dragon: Jake Long in the episode "Game On")
Wuya (as a human) (Xiaolin Showdown)

X
Xayide (The NeverEnding Story II: The Next Chapter)

Y
Yubaba (Spirited Away)
Sally Yumeno (Sally the Witch)
Yzma (The Emperor's New Groove)

Z
Zelda (The Swan Princess: The Mystery of the Enchanted Kingdom)
Zenioba (Spirited Away)
Zelena (Once Upon a Time)
Zi Yuan (The Mummy: Tomb of the Dragon Emperor)
Florence Zimmerman (The House with a Clock in Its Walls & 2018 film)
Rochelle Zimmerman (The Craft)

Mythical or legendary
Alcina
Angrboða
Aradia
Baba Yaga
Befana
The Bell Witch
Black Annis
Cassandra
Cerridwen
Circe
Erichtho
Freyja
Grimhild
Hag
Hecate
Hellawes
Jezebel
Kikimora
Lilith
Lutzelfrau
Marzanna
Medea
Morgause
Morgan le Fay
Sea Witch
The Witch of Endor

Radio
Bibi Blocksberg (Bibi Blocksberg)
Old Nancy (The Witch's Tale)

Video games
A
Actrise (Castlevania series)
Adel (Final Fantasy VIII)
Badeea Ali (Harry Potter: Hogwarts Mystery)
Ashley (WarioWare: Touched!)
Alicia (Bullet Witch)
Featherine Augustus Aurora (Umineko no naku koro ni)

B
Baba Yaga ( Quest for Glory)
Bayonetta (Bayonetta)
Beldam (Paper Mario: The Thousand-Year Door)
Belzed (Kick Master)
Berthilda (Crystal Castles)
Yoko Belnades (Castlevania: Aria of Sorrow & Castlevania: Dawn of Sorrow)
Bianca (Spyro: Year of the Dragon)
Big Bertha (Frogger: The Great Quest)
Marianna Blavatsky (Return to Castle Wolfenstein)

C
Cackletta (Mario & Luigi: Superstar Saga)
Castamira (Arcana)
Cia (Hyrule Warriors)
Cierra (Riviera: The Promised Land)
Cirae-Argoth (Witchaven II)
Vita Clotilde (Trails; first appears as a disembodied voice in The Legend of Heroes: Trails in the Sky the 3rd, first true appearance The Legend of Heroes: Trails of Cold Steel)

D
Dark Queen (Battletoads)
Deneb (Ogre Battle: The March of the Black Queen)
Drawcia (Kirby)

E
Ellen (The Witch's House)
Ellen (Touhou Project)
Enchantia (Curse of Enchantia)
Eva-Beatrice (Umineko no Naku Koro ni)
Evil Queen (Firelord)
Evil Queen Badh (Stormlord)

F
Flemeth (Dragon Age series)

G
Christelle Grinberry (No More Heroes)
Hannah Grinberry (No More Heroes)
Rebecca "Becky" Grinberry (No More Heroes)
Gruntilda – (Banjo-Kazooie series)

H
Hagatha (‘’Hearthstone’’)
Rinoa Heartilly (Final Fantasy VIII)
Hecubah (Nox)
Himiko Yumeno (Danganronpa V3: Killing Harmony)

I
Ice Queen (Stonekeep)
Illwhyrin (Witchaven)
Irene (The Legend of Zelda: A Link Between Worlds)

J
Jeanne (Bayonetta)
Jenka (Cave Story)

K
Kagura (Tenchu: Wrath of Heaven)
Marisa Kirisame (Touhou Project)
Patchouli Knowledge (Touhou Project)
Konoe A. Mercury/Nine The Phantom (Blazblue)
Kammy Koopa (Paper Mario)
 Kotake and Koume (Legend of Zelda (Video Game) )
Edea Kramer (Final Fantasy VIII)
Serika Kurusugawa (To Heart)
Kyōgoku Maria (Sengoku Basara)

L
Lady Maud (The Legend of Zelda: Tri Force Heroes)
Julia Laforeze (Castlevania: Curse of Darkness)
Lana (Hyrule Warriors)
Lil' Witch (Shrek SuperSlam)
Lulu (Final Fantasy X)
Luna (Shrek SuperSlam)

M
Maple (The Legend of Zelda: Oracle of Seasons and Oracle of Ages/The Legend of Zelda: A Link to the Past)
Alice Margatroid (Touhou Project)
Marilyn (Paper Mario: The Thousand-Year Door)
Mai (Touhou Project)
Marion (Gunbird and Gunbird 2)
Marjoly (Rhapsody: A Musical Adventure)
Medusa (Rings of Medusa)
Metallia (The Witch and the Hundred Knight)
Mesaanya (Dragon Knight II)
Midna (The Legend of Zelda: Twilight Princess)
Emma Millstein (Trails; first appearance The Legend of Heroes: Trails of Cold Steel)
Minax (Ultima II and Ultima Online)
 Miriam (Wandersong)
Misery (Cave Story)
Mizrabel (Castle of Illusion Starring Mickey Mouse)
Morgana (Vengeance of Excalibur, Chronicles of the Sword, Legion: The Legend of Excalibur)
Morrigan (Dragon Age series)

O
Oichi (Sengoku Basara)

P
Pagan (War Gods)

R
Rosa (Bayonetta)

S
Scylla (Hugo)
Shadow Queen (Paper Mario: The Thousand-Year Door)
Selena (Lure of the Temptress)
Siriadne (Shard of Spring)
Skar (Dun Darach)
The Sorceress (Spyro: Year of the Dragon)
Synn (Dungeons & Dragons: Shadow over Mystara)
Syrup (Legend of Zelda: Oracle of Ages/Legend of Zelda: Oracle of Seasons)

T
Tabasa (Tessa outside Japan) (Red Earth and Warzard)
Twinrova (The Legend of Zelda: Ocarina of Time)
Drolta Tzuentes (Castlevania: Bloodlines)

U
Ultimecia (Final Fantasy VIII)

V
Valsharess (Neverwinter Nights)
Vivian (Paper Mario: The Thousand-Year Door)
Helga von Bulow (Return to Castle Wolfenstein)

W
Gruntilda Winkybunion (Banjo-Kazooie & sequels)
Witches (infected) (Left 4 dead & Left 4 Dead 2)
Witch (Minecraft)

X
Xandrilia (Wings of Death)

Y
Yuki (Touhou Project)
Yuria (Demon's Souls)
Yvaine (Battle Realms)

Z
Zoldrane (Nicky Boum)

Webcomic
Gwynn (Sluggy Freelance)
Jade Harley (Homestuck)
Feferi Peixes (Homestuck)
Damara Megido (Homestuck)

See also
Witchcraft

Notes

References

Witches
Witches